Goth Opera is an original Doctor Who novel, published by Virgin Publishing in their Missing Adventures range of Doctor Who novels. It was the first book in that series and a sequel to the New Adventure book Blood Harvest, but it can be read separately.

Plot
As the Fifth Doctor and his companions vacation in Tasmania they become caught up in a scheme by the Time Lord Ruath to resurrect the vampire Yarven (from Blood Harvest).  Ruath sends a vampire baby to attack the Doctor and turn him into a vampire, but the child instead attacks and converts Nyssa.  Unable to provide Yarven with the Doctor's Time Lord blood, Ruath gives her own blood to Yarven, causing her to die and regenerate into a vampire Time Lord.

Nyssa, while trying fight her new vampire nature, is drawn to Yarven's castle, where she learns more about Ruath's plan.  Ruath has created a genetically enhanced mist that can turn normal humans into vampires, and kill those who use traditional methods (garlic, crosses, etc.) to protect themselves.  Ruath has also invented a Time Freeze, a small Time Loop that can hold the Earth in a perpetual night, leaving the vampires free to roam and feed.

Background and continuity
The plot for the novel was originally developed from an unproduced comic strip for  Doctor Who Magazine, which would have featured the Fourth Doctor in a fight against Dracula.  Cornell revised the story to use the Fifth Doctor for this first Missing Adventure.

Placement problem
The back cover of Goth Opera says that it takes place between the television stories Snakedance and Mawdryn Undead. However, it is difficult to avoid the fact that there is actually no gap between these shows to put an extra adventure.

Cover
The novel's cover was originally to feature a far more graphic image of Nyssa's shirt covered in blood.
The artwork had to be adjusted and the blood airbrushed out when retailer W H Smith insisted that they would not stock the book in that form.

References

1994 British novels
1994 science fiction novels
Fifth Doctor novels
Virgin Missing Adventures
Novels by Paul Cornell
Vampire novels
Manchester in fiction